The flag of the Iroquois Confederacy or Haudenosaunee flag is the flag used to represent the six nations of the Haudenosaunee. It is a purple flag with four connected white squares and an eastern white pine tree in the center.

History 

In the 1980s, the Iroquois men's national lacrosse team needed a flag ahead of a competition in Australia to represent the Haudenosaunee as an independent entity. Rick Hill, a Tuscarora artist, writer, and educator associated with the lacrosse team, worked with Mohawk father-son duo Harold and Tim Johnson of North Tonawanda, New York to create the design. Harold Johnson ran a t-shirt shop in Niagara Falls, New York and his son Tim Johnson was a student at the University at Buffalo. Hill's original draft was inspired by Onondaga faithkeeper Oren Lyons and adapted by the Johnsons. The lacrosse team accepted the design and it later became a symbol for the Haudenosaunee.

Symbolism 

The flag's design is based on the Hiawatha belt, a symbol which dates back to the original uniting of the five tribes of the Haudenosaunee. The wampum belt was a symbol of unity between the five (and later six) tribes for hundreds of years prior to its adaptation for use as a flag.

Purple is considered "the color of the Iroquois," as it is the color derived from the mollusk shells used in making the wampum. The four squares and one tree each represent one of the original five nations of the Haudenosaunee. From left to right they are: Seneca, Cayuga, Onondaga (the tree), Oneida, and Mohawk. Their placement on the flag mirrors their geographic placement. The eastern white pine tree also represents the Tree of Peace within the Onondaga nation, where the five nations united to form the Haudenosaunee. Fittingly, the needles of the eastern white pine are clustered in groups of five.

See also 
 Flags of Native Americans in the United States
 Iroquois confederacy
 Wampum

References 

Iroquois
Iroquois culture
Iroquois